The violoncello da spalla, known informally as the cello da spalla,  is a small cello played braced against the shoulder.

The violoncello da spalla was designed to be played by violinists, who have limited experience playing instruments such as the viola da gamba or cello, which are held in a vertical position fixed between legs. The viola da spalla is held on the shoulder and chest, and is larger than the viola.

There are also numerous instances of suites, serenades, divertimenti, and cassations that begin and/or end with marches.  If these marches were to get the players in or out, the bass lines could have been played on these instruments, as well as on procession cellos which are regular cellos with a tiny hole under the neck where the player can attach a hook and a strap.

Possible use by Bach

Because of the variety in terminology used in the eighteenth century, it can be difficult now to determine exactly what instrument was intended in specific instances. The terms "violoncello da spalla" and "viola da spalla" tend to appear in theoretical works rather than as instrument designations from composers. However, it is possible that J. S. Bach, and perhaps other composers, might have intended the violoncello da spalla in cases where the "violoncello piccolo" is specified. This term, "violoncello piccolo", features in many of the Bach cantatas, with the parts written in a variety of clefs (bass, tenor, alto and soprano). The variety of clefs has been taken as a representation of the instrument's relatively wide range. 
The five-string version of the instrument may have been what Bach had in mind for performing his Cello Suite No. 6 (which presents many technical problems on a four-string cello).

Musicians
 François Fernandez
 Sigiswald Kuijken
 Sergey Malov
 Ryo Terakado
 Dmitry Badiarov
 Samuel Hengebaert
 Olav Johansson
 Andrew Gonzalez

See also

 Chest of viols
 Division viol
 Lyra viol
 Viola bastarda
 Pardessus de viole
 Viol
 Violone

References

Cellos